This is a Timeline of women in Antarctica. This article describes many of the firsts and accomplishments that women from various countries have accomplished in different fields of endeavor on the continent of Antarctica.

650s 
650
 Māori explorer, Ui-te-rangiora, is described in oral tradition as having reached Antarctic waters.

1770s 
1773
 The first Western woman to visit the Antarctic region was Louise Séguin, who sailed on the Roland with Yves Joseph de Kerguelen in 1773.
1776-1777
 First female scientist in the sub-Antarctic region is botanist valet, Jeanne Baret.

1830s 
1833
 First written account about sub-Antarctic travel from a woman's perspective is written by Abby Jane Morrell.
1839
 An unnamed female castaway who later traveled on the Eliza Scott and Sabrina journeyed "within sight of the continent."

1930s 
1931
 Norwegian Ingrid Christensen and her companion, Mathilde Wegger, were the first recorded women to see Antarctica.

1935
Caroline Mikkelsen of Denmark becomes the first woman to set foot on Antarctica.

1937
Christensen landed at Scullin Monolith, becoming the first woman to set foot on the Antarctic mainland, followed by her daughter, Augusta Sofie Christensen, and two other women: Lillemor Rachlew, and Solveig Widerøe.

1940s 
1947
Jackie Ronne is the first woman to explore Antarctica.

1947-1948
Ronne and Jennie Darlington winter-over. They are the first women to spend a year on Antarctica.

1950s 

1956
Geologist Maria Klenova of the Soviet Union was the first woman to begin scientific work in Antarctica. Klenova helped create the first Antarctic atlas.
Jennie Darlington publishes her book about spending a year in Antarctica called My Antarctic Honeymoon.
1957
 Ruth Kelley and Pat Heppinstall, airline stewardesses, become first women to visit a United States Antarctic base.

1959-1960
 Mary Gillham, Susan Ingham, Isobel Bennett and Hope MacPherson became the first British and Australian women scientists to do research in the Antarctic region, joining an Australian National Antarctic Research Expedition trip to Macquarie Island in December 1959.

1960s 

1960
 Artist Nel Law is the first Australian women to set foot in Antarctica, landing at Mawson and visiting in an unofficial capacity.
1968
 The first group of female scientists conducted research in Antarctica. They included biologist Irene Bernasconi, bacteriologist Maria Adela Caria, biologist Elena Martinez Fontes and Carmen Pujals, a specialist in algae. This made Bernasconi the first woman to lead an Antartic expedition. She was aged 72 at the time. 
The first New Zealand woman to visit the mainland of Antarctica was Marie Darby.
1969

 First team of women scientists from the United States, led by Lois Jones, works on Antarctica. 
 First group of women to reach the pole were Pamela Young, Jean Pearson, Lois Jones, Eileen McSaveney, Kay Lindsay and Terry Tickhill. The women stepped off of the C-130 ramp at the same time. 
 Christine Müller-Schwarze is the first American woman to do scientific research on the continent of Antarctica.

1970s 
1970
 Engineer Irene C. Peden is the first United States woman to work in the interior of Antarctica.
1971
 New Zealand limnologist Ann Chapman leads a biological survey of frozen lakes in the Taylor Valley, becoming the first woman to lead an Antarctic expedition.
1974
Mary Alice McWhinnie is the chief scientist at McMurdo Station, becoming the first United States woman serving in that capacity on Antarctica. 
 McWhinnie and Mary Odile Cahoon become the first women to overwinter at McMurdo Station.
 Australian women are allowed to travel to the Australian Antarctic Territory (AAT).
1974-1975
 First women civilian contractors on Antarctica were Elena Marty and Jan Boyd.
1975
 Eleanor Honnywill is the first woman to be awarded the Fuchs Medal from the British Antarctic Survey (BAS).
 The House of Representatives in Australia is asked how many women have gone to Antarctica so far: the answer is one.
1975-1976
Mary Alice McWhinnie is the first woman scientist to work at Palmer Station. 
 The first three Australian women to visit the continent of Antarctica in an official capacity -Elizabeth Chipman, Jutta Hösel and Shelagh Robinson visit Casey station for the summer.
1976
Dr Zoe Gardner becomes the first woman to winter with the Australian Antarctic program as a medical officer on sub-Antarctic Macquarie Island.

1977
 Meher Moos becomes the first Indian woman to visit Antarctica.
1978
 Silvia Morello de Palma of Argentina is the first woman to give birth on Antarctica on January 7.
 Margaret Winslow of the United States is the first woman to lead an expedition to Livingston Island, Antarctica

1979
 First year the United States Navy advertises for "qualified female volunteers to over-winter in Antarctica."
1978-1979
 Michele Eileen Raney is the first woman physician to work year-round on Antarctica. She was also the first woman to winter at the South Pole.

1980s 
1981
 Dr Louise Holliday is the first woman to winter in Antarctica for the Australian Antarctic program serving as medical officer at Davis station.

1983
 First British woman, Janet Thomson, joins the British Antarctic Survey, and becomes the first British woman on Antarctica.
 On November 16, American, Brooke Knapp, is the first person to land at McMurdo Station for a round the world flight and the first person to pilot a business jet over both the North and South Poles.
 Geologist Sudipta Sengupta and Aditi Pant, a marine biologist are the first women scientists from India to take part in Antarctic Expedition.
1984
 Josefina Castellví is the first Spanish woman to participate in and coordinate an international expedition to Antarctica.
1985
 First woman married at the South Pole is Patricia Manglicmot to Randall Chambers. 
 The first women to winter-over at Palmer Station were Ann Wylette and Becky Heimark.
Thea de Moel is the first Dutch woman to reach Antarctica as a crew member aboard the ‘Footsteps of Scott Expedition’ ship ‘Southern Quest’. 
1986
 The first Polar Medal  is awarded to a woman, Virginia Fiennes, who was honored for her work in the Transglobe Expedition.
 Ann Peoples became the manager of the Berg Field Center in 1986, becoming the first U.S. woman to serve in a "significant leadership role."
1987
 Elizabeth Chipman publishes Women on the Ice: A History of Women in the Far South.
1988
 American Lisa Densmore is the first woman to summit Mount Vinson.
1987-1988
 First South African women to over-winter at Marion Island were Marianna Steenkamp and Marieta Cawood.
1988-1989
 Alison J. Clifton commands the Macquarie Island station, becoming the first woman to lead a sub-Antarctic base.
1989
 Victoria E. Murden and Shirley Metz are the first women to reach the South Pole by land.
 Denise Allen and Dr Lynn Williams are jointly the first women to be awarded the Australian Antarctic Medal.
 Australian, Diana Patterson, head of Mawson station, becomes the first female station leader of an Antarctic base.
1989-1990
 Joan Russell at Casey station and Monika Puskeppeleit at Georg von Neumayer are the first women to simultaneously lead bases on the continent.

1990s 

1990-1991
 First all-female over-wintering group spends the winter at Georg von Neumayer, with leader Monika Puskeppeleit.
1991
 In-Young Ahn is the first female leader of an Asian research station (King Sejong Station), and the first South Korean woman to step onto Antarctica.
 Serap Tilav is the first Turkish woman at the South Pole.
 Junko Tabei, who later becomes the first woman to complete the Seven Summits, climbs to the summit of Mount Vinson.
1992
 Judy Chesser Coffman, of the U.S. Navy, was the first female helicopter pilot to fly in Antarctica, in support of the National Science Foundation (NSF).
1993
 Ann Bancroft leads the first all-woman expedition to the South Pole and becomes the first woman to reach both the South and North Pole.
1994
 Liv Arnesen of Norway is the first woman to ski alone to the South Pole. 
 Miriam-Rose Ungunmerr-Baumann with Lin Onus become the first Indigenous Australians to visit Antarctica.
1996
 First year that women over-winter at the Halley Research Station.
1996-1997
 Laurence de la Ferrière is the first French woman to cross the Antarctic solo.
 Dr. Aithne Rowseis the first South African woman to overwinter in Antarctica 1997 (see SANAE).

1997-1998
 Four Ukrainian women visited Antarctica and Ukrainian research station Vernadsky Research Base as part of the 2nd country's Antarctic expedition: geophysicist Maryna Orlova, meteorologists Svitlana Krakovska and Lyudmyla Mankivska, and cook Galyna Kolotnytska.

2000s 

2000
 Zhao Ping and Lin Qing are the first Chinese women to over-winter at Antarctica. 
Fiona Thornewill and Catharine Hartley become the first British women to walk to the South Pole on foot.
 Caroline Hamilton and four other women become the first British women to ski to the South Pole as an all-women expedition.
2001
 Ann Bancroft and Liv Arnesen are the first women to ski across Antarctica.
2003
 Lynne Cox swims more than mile in Antarctic waters.
 US Coast Guard pilot Sidonie Bosin is the first female aviation officer in charge of air crews in the Antarctic.
 Physician Assistant Heidi Lim Rehm spends first winter at Amundsen–Scott South Pole Station. As of 2020 she holds the record for the most winters spent by a woman at the South Pole. She spent five winters total, 2003, 2005, 2006, 2007, 2008. 
2004
 Fiona Thornewill became first British woman to ski solo and unsupported to the South Pole in a record breaking 41 days.
 Linda Beilharz is the first Australian woman to ski to the South Pole.
 Jackie Ronne publishes her memoirs about her year in Antarctica called Antarctica's First Lady: Memoirs of the First American Woman to Set Foot on the Antarctic Continent and Winter-Over as a Member of a Pioneering Expedition.
2005
 Merieme Chadid is the first Moroccan woman on Antarctica.
 Loretta Feris is the first black South African woman to work as a principal investigator for an Antarctic project.
2006
 Hannah McKeand sets coast-to-pole solo/unsupported record of 39 days, 9 hours and 33 minutes.
 Bettine van Vuuren of South Africa is the first female scientist Chief Scientist in the South African National Antarctic Programme's annual relief voyage in 2006.
2007
 Clare O'Leary is the first Irish woman to reach the South Pole. 
 Sarah Ames of Germany is the first woman to complete a marathon on all seven continents.
2008
 Sumiyo Tsuzuki is the first Japanese woman to reach the South Pole.
2009
 On December 30 several women as part of the Kaspersky Commonwealth Antarctic Expedition, reached the South Pole by ski and set records for their countries. Sophia Pang becomes the first Singaporean woman to reach the South Pole. Reena Kaushal Dharmshaktu become the first Indian woman to ski to the pole. Stephanie Solomonides became the first person from Cyprus to reach the pole.

2010s 

2010
 Meagan McGrath becomes the first Canadian to ski solo, unassisted and unsupported, to the South Pole.
 Karla Wheelock from Mexico leads the first Latin American expedition in Antarctica.
2011
 First woman from Kuwait on Antarctica is Maryam al-Joan. 
 First African-American woman to reach the South Pole is Barbara Hillary on January 6. She is also the first African-American woman to have been to both poles. 
2012
 Felicity Ashton of the United Kingdom is the first person to ski alone across Antarctica, using only her own muscle power. She is also the first woman to cross Antarctica alone.
 The first woman to climb Mount Sidley was sixteen year old Romanian Crina Coco Popescu. 
 Zeena Al Towayya is the first Omani woman, and Sahar Al Shamrani is the first Saudi woman to travel to Antarctica.
2014
 On December 23, the Seven Summits Women Team becomes the first group of Nepali women to climb the Seven Summits when they reach the top of Mount Vinson.
2013
 On December 27, 2013 Maria Leijerstam from the United Kingdom became the first person in the world to cycle to the South Pole from the edge of the Antarctic Continent.
2016
 First large (78 member) all-women expedition, Homeward Bound, goes to Antarctica.

2018

 Linda (Marie) Eketoft, a lawyer and writer from Sweden, became the first woman to Heliski Antarctica on 14 December 2018. 
2019

 On December 9, 2019 Tynthia (Tia) King became the second African American to reach the South Pole.

2020s

2020 

 Anja Blacha set the record for the longest solo, unsupported, and unassisted polar expedition by a woman.

2022 

 Preet Chandi became the first woman of color to reach the South Pole solo and unsupported when she completed a solo expedition across Antarctica to the South Pole, finishing on 3 January 2022.

See also 
 Arctic exploration
 European and American voyages of scientific exploration
 Farthest South
 History of Antarctica
 List of polar explorers
 Women in Antarctica
 List of Antarctic women

References

Citations

Sources

External links 
 Women in Antarctica

Antarctica
.
.
History of Antarctica